Air Vice-Marshal Alan Kenneth Gillespie  is a senior Royal Air Force officer. He currently serves as the Director of the Military Aviation Authority.

RAF career
Gillespie was commissioned into the Royal Air Force in 1988. He became commanding officer of No. 23 Squadron in 2008, commander No. 903 Expeditionary Air Wing at Camp Bastion in Afghanistan in 2009 and station commander RAF Waddington in 2011. He went on to become UK Air Component Commander at Al Udeid Air Base in Qatar and Air Officer Commanding No. 83 Expeditionary Air Group in 2013, the Battlespace Management Force Commander in 2015 and Head of the Air Transformation
Programme in 2017. He was appointed Air Officer Commanding No. 2 Group in September 2019, and subsequently as Director of the Military Aviation Authority in December 2021.

He was appointed a Commander of the Order of the British Empire in the 2018 New Year Honours.

References

Commanders of the Order of the British Empire
Living people
Royal Air Force air marshals
Royal Air Force personnel of the Iraq War
Year of birth missing (living people)